The Ukrainian Liberation Army (Ukrainske Vyzvolne Viysko, UVV) was an umbrella organization created in 1943, providing collective name for all Ukrainian units serving with the German Army during World War II. A single formation by that name did not exist. The designation was used by Ukrainian nationalists in reference to a number of companies and local Ostbataillonen of Hiwi volunteers desiring to free their own territories from the Soviet rule. They  included enlisted Ukrainian prisoners of war (POWs) of the Red Army. The core of the Liberation Army wearing the УВВ sleeve badge (right, since 1945) originated from the 14th Waffen Grenadier Division of the SS (1st Ukrainian) reorganized in April 1945 into the Ukrainian National Army (UNA) active until the German surrender in May 1945.

Command
The Nazis estimated that there were 180,000 Ukrainian volunteers serving with units scattered all over Europe and proposed to merge them into a single force, the UVV.

Headed by Ukrainian general Mykhailo Omelianovych-Pavlenko, the unit grew to 50,000 by 1944 and peaked at some 80,000 towards the end of the war. 

In April 1945, numerous remnants of the UVV were incorporated into the short-lived Ukrainian National Army commanded by general Pavlo Shandruk, disbanded in May 1945.

See also
 Russian Liberation Army

References

Foreign volunteer units of the Wehrmacht
Military history of Ukraine
Military units and formations established in 1943
Military units and formations disestablished in 1945
Ukrainian collaborators with Nazi Germany